Britain most often refers to:

 The United Kingdom, a sovereign state in Europe comprising the island of Great Britain, the north-eastern part of the island of Ireland and many smaller islands
 Great Britain, the largest island in the United Kingdom and Europe.

Britain may also refer to:

Places
 British Isles, an archipelago comprising Great Britain, Ireland and many other smaller islands
 British Islands, the UK, Channel Islands and Isle of Man collectively
 Roman Britain, a Roman province corresponding roughly to modern-day England and Wales
 Historical predecessors to the present-day United Kingdom:
 Kingdom of Great Britain (1707 to 1801)
 United Kingdom of Great Britain and Ireland (1801 to 1922)
 Britain (place name)
 Britain, Virginia, an unincorporated community in the United States

People
 Calvin Britain (1800–1862), an American politician
 Kristen Britain, an American novelist

Other uses
 Captain Britain, a Marvel Comics superhero

See also
 
 
 Terminology of the British Isles
 England
 Britains
 Britannia
 Brittain (disambiguation)
 Brittany (disambiguation)
 Brit (disambiguation)
 Britten (disambiguation)
 Briton (disambiguation)
 Brittonic languages
 British (disambiguation)
 Great Britain (disambiguation)
 Little Britain (disambiguation)
 New Britain (disambiguation)
 National sports teams of the United Kingdom